The 2002 Major League Lacrosse season was the second season of the league. The season began on June 6 and concluded with the championship game on September 1, 2002.

General information
Baltimore moved its home games to Ravens Stadium. New Jersey moved its home games to Commerce Bank Ballpark.

For the first time, a regular season game is played at a neutral site as the Rochester Rattlers defeated the New Jersey Pride at Hersheypark Stadium in Hershey, Pennsylvania on June 22.

Regular season
W = Wins, L = Losses, PCT= Winning Percentage, PF= Points For, PA = Points Against

All Star Game
July 21, 2002
National 21-16 American at Prince George's Stadium, Bowie, Maryland, Scott Urick MVP

Playoffs
Semifinals  August 24 & 25 2002
Long Island 19-11 New Jersey @ Hofstra Stadium, Hempstead, New York
Baltimore 15-10 Boston @ Ravens Stadium, Baltimore, Maryland

MLL championship game  September 1, 2002

Baltimore 21-13 Long Island @ Columbus Crew Stadium, Columbus, Ohio

Bracket

Awards

Weekly Awards
The MLL did not give out awards weekly for the best offensive player and best defensive player in 2002.

 
Major League Lacrosse